An armchair detective is a fictional investigator who does not personally visit a crime scene or interview witnesses; instead, the detective either reads the story of the crime in a newspaper or has it recounted by another person. As the armchair detective never sees any of the investigation, the reader can attempt to solve the mystery on the same terms as the detective.

The phrase possibly originates in a Sherlock Holmes story from 1893, The Greek Interpreter, in which Holmes says of his brother Mycroft, "If the art of the detective began and ended in reasoning from an arm-chair, my brother would be the greatest criminal agent that ever lived."

Examples of armchair detectives in fiction

"The first example of armchair detecting can be found in the work of Edgar Allan Poe. In "The Mystery of Marie Rogêt" (1842), C. Auguste Dupin, working wholly from newspaper accounts, arrives at the correct explanation for a young woman's mysterious disappearance."

Baroness Orczy's  Old Man in the Corner sits in a restaurant and talks to an acquaintance about cases, almost always finishing by revealing that he has solved the crime.

Lancelot Priestley appeared in a long-running series of novels by Cecil Street after making his debut in The Paddington Mystery (1925).

Marian Phipps, a character in stories by Phyllis Bentley, is an armchair detective in her earliest appearances, solving cases that a policeman friend relates to her.

A more literal use of this term can be found in Rex Stout's Nero Wolfe novels and novellas. He only leaves his house in exceptional circumstances, and typically delegates all the leg work for his cases to his assistant, Archie Goodwin. "I would be an idiot to leave this chair, made to fit me," Wolfe says in the 1947 novella "Before I Die".

L Lawliet from Death Note could also be considered an armchair detective as he solves crimes that were never solved and he reads the cases he takes on from the crime files.

Magazine
The Armchair Detective magazine was "primarily a mystery fanzine featuring articles, commentary, checklists, bibliographical material, etc., started by the legendary crime fan and bibliographer Allen J. Hubin."  It was published from 1967 to 1997.

Radio and television
The Armchair Detective was the title of a British radio series created by Ernest Dudley.
Armchair Detective was also the title of an early TV series on KTLA, flagship station of the Paramount Television Network (approximately 1949–50).
Armchair Detectives is the name of a British TV game show hosted by Susan Calman in 2017 on the BBC

References

Detective fiction